Associazione Sportiva Dilettantistica Progetto Sant'Elia or simply Progetto Sant'Elia was an Italian association football club, based in the district Sant'Elia of Cagliari, Sardinia.

History 
The club was founded in 1998. After several years in the regional championships, in the 2010–11 season they won Eccellenza Sardinia and so were promoted to Serie D for the first time. In its first Serie D season, in 2011–12, the company avoided relegation against Monterotondo in the playoff (after finishing the season in fifteenth place). Progetto Calcio Sant'Elia has been relegated in the 2012–13 season to Eccellenza Sardinia.

The club bankrupt in 2015.

Colours and badge 
The team's colours were blue and white.

References

External links
Official website
Diario Sportivo - Progetto Calcio Sant'Elia

Football clubs in Italy
Football clubs in Sardinia
Association football clubs established in 1998
1998 establishments in Italy